Stoehr may refer to:

Anna Stoehr (1900–2014), American supercentenarian
Brooke Stoehr (born 1980), American college basketball coach and former player
Isabelle Stoehr (born 1979), professional squash player from France
Nicole Stoehr of Devo 2.0, a quintet created for Walt Disney Records
Taylor Stoehr (1931–2013), American literature professor and Paul Goodman's literary executor

See also
Stoer
Stohr (disambiguation)

Americanized surnames